Seyfiabad may refer to:
 Seyfiabad, Bushehr
 Seyfiabad, Zanjan

See also
 Safiabad (disambiguation)
 Seyfabad (disambiguation)